Neudietendorf is a railway station in the town of Neudietendorf, Thuringia, Germany. The station lies on the Halle-Bebra railway and Neudietendorf-Schweinfurt railway and the train services are operated by Deutsche Bahn, Süd-Thüringen-Bahn and Erfurter Bahn.

Train services
The station is served by the following service(s):
regional express (RE 1) Göttingen - Erfurt - Jena - Gera - Zwickau

Bus services
 Erfurt - Neudietendorf - Wandersleben - Seebergen - Gotha

References

Railway stations in Thuringia
Buildings and structures in Gotha (district)
Railway stations in Germany opened in 1847